The 2022 LCS season is the fifth year of North America's League Championship Series, a professional esports league for the MOBA PC game League of Legends, under partnership and the tenth overall. 

The Lock In tournament began on January 14 and concluded on January 30 with Team Liquid defeating Evil Geniuses 3–0.

The spring regular season began on February 5 and will conclude with the Mid-Season Showdown, which will start on April 2 and finish on April 24 at NRG Stadium in Houston, Texas.

The summer split began on June 18 and will finish with the Summer Playoffs, which will begin on August 20 and conclude with the Summer Finals.

League changes 
On November 16, 2021, Riot announced the official format for the 2022 season, shortly after the conclusion of the 2021 League of Legends World Championship. Returning for the second year was the Lock In, acting as a preseason tournament which does not affect the regular season standings. The winner and runners-up of the Summer Final from the previous season, 100 Thieves and Team Liquid alternately chose from a pool of the remaining 8 teams in the league, as to who would be in their individual groups. Each group would play each opponent in their own group once, in a four-day single Round Robin. The top four teams from each group would then be seeded into an eight-team, single-elimination bracket. The winner of the bracket would receive a cash prize of US$150,000 and be named the 2nd ever Lock In Champion.

Additionally, some changes introduced in 2021 were reverted, namely the combination of records from the Spring and Summer Splits to decide seeding for the Summer Playoffs. Once again each Split will consist of an 18-game double round robin, and Spring record will affect the Mid Season Showdown, while success in the Summer Split will be the only factor in seeding for the Summer Playoffs.

As 2022 was the tenth anniversary of the League Championship Series, Riot announced a new LCS logo alongside "year-long celebrations planned" for the league.

Broadcasting
The English broadcast is available for live viewing on the LoL Esports website, as well as on Twitch and YouTube. VOD's are also posted on LoL Esports and on YouTube. A Spanish broadcast was produced by the LCS team FlyQuest.

Lock In

Group stage 
 Group A

 Group B

Tiebreakers were based on the head-to-head record

Knockout stage

Spring

Teams and rosters

Regular season

Playoffs

Awards

Notes

References 

2022 in esports
2022 multiplayer online battle arena tournaments
League of Legends Championship Series seasons